The 1951 Sylvania Television Awards were presented on November 8, 1951, at the Hotel Pierre in New York City. The awards were established earlier in 1951 by Sylvania Electric Products. Deems Taylor was the chairman of the judges committee.

The panel of 17 judges presented 12 awards as follows:

 Best television revue -Your Show of Shows
 Best director - Max Liebman, Your Show of Shows
 Best actor in television- Sid Caesar
 Best actress in television - Imogene Coca
 Best use of film in television - Fireside Theatre
 Producer-director - Frank Wisbar, Fireside Theatre
 Writer - Arnold Belgard, Fireside Theatre
 Outstanding feat of television journalism - WPIX, New York City, for coordinating and producing pool telecasts of the Kefauver Committee hearings into organized crime
 Public service - WDSU, New Orleans, for first televising the Kefauver Committee hearings
 Best program planned as public service - Meet the Press, NBC
 Excellence as a moderator or master of ceremonies - John Charles Daly, What's My Line?
 Best program suitable for children - The Chicago Zoo Parade

The "grand award" was not awarded, as the committee found no program that measured up to its concept of "truly outstanding entertainment."

References

Sylvania Awards